Zabrotes subfasciatus, the Mexican bean weevil, is a species of leaf beetle in the family Chrysomelidae. It is found in Africa, North America, South America, Southern Asia, and Europe.

References

Further reading

External links

 

Bruchinae
Articles created by Qbugbot
Beetles described in 1833